Guilty Conscience may refer to

 Guilty Conscience (film), a 1985 American TV movie
 Guilty Conscience (album), a 2014 album by J. Holiday
 "Guilty Conscience" (song), by Eminem from the album The Slim Shady LP
 "Guilty Conscience", a song by 070 Shake from the album Modus Vivendi

See also
 A Guilty Conscience, a 1921 film
 Conscience, for the psychological phenomenon